Guillermo Coria was the defending champion but lost in the first round to Robin Vik.

Stan Wawrinka won the title, after Novak Djokovic retired in the final while leading 3–1 in the first set tiebreak.

Seeds

Draw

Finals

Top half

Bottom half

References

External links
 Main draw
 Qualifying draw

Croatia Open Umag